172 (one hundred [and] seventy-two) is the natural number following 171 and preceding 173.

In mathematics
172 is a part of a near-miss for being a counterexample to Fermat's last theorem, as 1353 + 1383 = 1723 − 1. This is only the third near-miss of this form, two cubes adding to one less than a third cube. It is also a "thickened cube number", half an odd cube (73 = 343) rounded up to the next integer.

See also
 172 (disambiguation)

References 

Integers